François de Maucroix, born in Noyon, (Oise) in 1619, died 1708, was a French poet and translator.

Biography 
He was a long-time friend of La Fontaine; their mutual literary influence was very important, and it was to him that La Fontaine addressed The first book of fables (III), The Miller, his Son and the Ass.

He was ordained as a priest, and in the Spring of 1647, he purchased a prebendary. He remained canon of Rheims until his death in 1708.

Contrary to the popular legend, de Maucroix was not definitely a classmate of La Fontaine's at Chateau Thierry. Pierre Clarac has remarked that, at about the age of 25, while they were a part of the Knights of the Round Table (Literary Circle), who were a group of ('robins'?) who met from 1646 to discuss their works and diverse other subjects, that although being on first-name term with Pellison and Cassandre, Maucroix still used the more formal 'vous' when addressing La Fontaine. Some authors have theorised that they only met within The Knights.

Works 

Des poèmes et des traductions, publiés en 1685 dans les Ouvrages de Prose et de Poësie des Sieurs de Maucroy et de La Fontaine
Sa Correspondance, publiée en 1854.

References

Sources 
 Translated as best as possible with limited resources from :fr:François de Maucroix

1619 births
1708 deaths
French poets
French translators
French male poets
French male non-fiction writers
17th-century French translators